Nikolaus, Hereditary Grand Duke of Oldenburg (10 August 18973 April 1970) was the eldest son of Frederick Augustus II, Grand Duke of Oldenburg, who was the last ruling Grand Duke of Oldenburg.

In 1931, Nikolaus succeeded to his father's titles and assumed the role of pretender to the Grand Duchy, until his death in 1970.

Early life
Nikolaus was born at Oldenburg, Grand Duchy of Oldenburg, the third child and first son of Frederick Augustus II, Grand Duke of Oldenburg (1852–1931) (son of Peter II, Grand Duke of Oldenburg and Princess Elisabeth of Saxe-Altenburg) and his wife, Duchess Elisabeth Alexandrine of Mecklenburg-Schwerin (1869–1955) (daughter of Frederick Francis II, Grand Duke of Mecklenburg-Schwerin and Princess Marie of Schwarzburg-Rudolstadt).

He was a first cousin of Queen Juliana of the Netherlands and with his wife and other family members was a guest at her 1937 wedding to Prince Bernhard of Lippe-Biesterfeld.

Marriage
Nikolaus married on 26 October 1921 in Arolsen to Princess Helena of Waldeck and Pyrmont (1899–1948), only daughter of Friedrich, Prince of Waldeck and Pyrmont and his wife, Princess Bathildis of Schaumburg-Lippe. and they had issue.
Anton-Günther, Duke of Oldenburg (16 January 1923 – 20 September 2014), married Princess Ameli of Löwenstein-Wertheim-Freudenberg 7 August 1951, and had issue.
Duchess Rixa (28 March 1924 – 1 April 1939), who died after she fell off her horse.
Duke Peter (7 August 1926 – 18 November 2016), married Princess Gertrud of Löwenstein-Wertheim-Freudenberg (24 Jan 1926-4 Feb 2011; sister of Princess Ameli of Löwenstein-Wertheim-Freudenberg) on 7 August 1951, and had issue.
Duchess Eilika (2 February 1928 - 26 January 2016), a bridesmaid at the 1937 wedding of Juliana of the Netherlands., married Emich, 7th Prince of Leiningen 10 August 1950, and had issue. 
Duke Egilmar (14 October 1934 - 2013)
Duke Friedrich August of Oldenburg (11 January 1936 - 9 July 2017), married Princess Marie Cécile of Prussia 4 December 1965, divorced 1989, and had issue. He remarried Countess Donata of Castell-Rüdenhausen 9 February 1991.
Duchess Altburg (14 October 1938), married Baron Rüdiger von Erffa (born on 19 April 1936) on 8 July 1967 and had issue (five sons and twelve grandchildren):
Duke Huno Friedrich Peter Max of Oldenburg (3 January 1940), married Countess Felicitas-Anita Schwerin von Krosigk (born 5 July 1941) on 6 June 1970 and had issue, including Beatrix von Storch.
Duke Johann Friedrich of Oldenburg (3 January 1940), married Countess Ilka of Ortenburg (born 29 June 1942) on 9 October 1971 and had issue, including Archduchess Eilika of Austria.

His wife died in 1948, he married secondly on 20 September 1950 in Güldenstein to Anne-Marie von Schutzbar gennant Milchling (1903–1991), daughter of Rudolf von Schutzbar gen. Milchling and Rose Marston. They had no children.

Ancestry

Notes and sources

Genealogisches Handbuch des Adels, Fürstliche Häuser, Reference: 1971

1897 births
1970 deaths
People from Oldenburg (city)
Grand Dukes of Oldenburg
Heirs apparent who never acceded
Burials at the Ducal Mausoleum, Gertrudenfriedhof (Oldenburg)
Sons of monarchs